, released in the US as Capcom Fighting Evolution, is a 2004 head-to-head fighting game from Capcom. It was originally released as a coin-operated arcade game for the Namco System 246 hardware and ported to the PlayStation 2 and Xbox. The game features characters from three different incarnations of the Street Fighter series, as well as characters from the Darkstalkers series and the CPS III arcade game Red Earth, with each character employing the fighting system from the game which they represent.

Gameplay
Capcom Fighting Evolution features characters all taken from the rosters of Street Fighter II' Turbo, Street Fighter Alpha 3, Street Fighter III: 3rd Strike, Darkstalkers 3, as well as the single game Red Earth. There are four selectable characters representing each series, excluding original character Ingrid and the boss characters Pyron and Shin Akuma. Each character uses a fighting system from the game which determines the techniques they can use and their super move gauge. Ingrid uses her unique fighting style with her own techniques, for a total of six fighting styles.

The game consists of two-on-two endurance-style matches similar to that of Rival Schools: United By Fate. The player selects a pair of character and then begins a match with one character. In the Japanese version of the game, if their current character is defeated for one round, then the next round will begin with the other character. In the North American version, the character can remain the same whether he or she wins or loses.

Characters

Street Fighter II
The Street Fighter II characters follow the playing style of Super Street Fighter II Turbo. Each Street Fighter II character only has a single-level Super Combo gauge that allows them to perform a Super Combo at MAX level. They cannot air block nor dash like other characters, but can stand up quickly when they fall to the ground. Unlike Super Turbo, each character has two Super Combo moves. Despite representing Street Fighter II, the graphics for Ryu and Bison are actually from their Capcom vs. SNK incarnation, while Guile is from Street Fighter Alpha 3 and Zangief received a new sprite (edited from his Street Fighter Alpha one) just for this game.

 Ryu (originally from Street Fighter)
 Guile
 M. Bison (Vega in Japan)
 Zangief

Darkstalkers
The Darkstalkers characters have a three-level "Special Stock" gauge like in Night Warriors: Darkstalkers Revenge, allowing them to perform ES Moves (enhanced versions of their regular special moves) or EX Specials (their super moves). They can also perform Guard Cancels (a counterattacking special move) and Chain Combos (which allows them to link any basic moves with another one of equal or greater strength). Darkstalkers characters can air block and dash, as well as do standing-up attacks and move while they're down.
 Anakaris
 Demitri
 Felicia
 Jedah

Street Fighter Alpha
The Street Fighter Alpha characters have single-level Custom Combo gauge and can perform a specific Super Combo or a Custom Combo when the gauge is 50% full. Does more damage at MAX level. They can also air block and perform Alpha Counters or recovering rolls.
 Guy (originally from Final Fight)
 Karin
 Rose
 Sakura

Red Earth
The characters from Red Earth have a Gem gauge which allows the player to stock up to two gems after the gauge fills up. When the player has a gem in stock, they can level-up their character and make them stronger or perform a Mystic Break (their super moves). The Red Earth characters have a blocking technique called the "Ultimate Guard", which allows them to block all attacks (except throws) without consuming energy. They can also follow an Ultimate Guard with an "Ultimate Counter".
 Leo
 Hauzer
 Hydron (Nool in Japan)
 Kenji (Mukuro in Japan)

Street Fighter III
The characters from Street Fighter III have a two-level Super Art gauge. Unlike in Street Fighter III, the characters in this game cannot select a Super Art before battle, but they have access to more than one Super Art (much like their Street Fighter II counterparts) as well as EX Moves, powered-up versions of their regular Special Moves. Players can also "parry" an opponent's attacks, which allows them to nullify one hit of an attack and usually slow down the attacker enough to allow the defender to make a quick counterattack. 
 Alex
 Chun-Li (originally from Street Fighter II)
 Urien
 Yun

Original character
 Ingrid - Ingrid is the only new character featured in the game, although she was one of the new characters intended to debut in the unreleased 3D fighting game Capcom Fighting All-Stars. She uses a unique fighting style with a three-level Super Arts gauge. In her ending, it is revealed that she is the Goddess of the Sun.

Ingrid makes a return appearance in Street Fighter Alpha 3 MAX for the PlayStation Portable; in that game, she is a time traveller trying to retrieve her power from M. Bison, who stole it and named it Psycho Power.

Bosses
 Pyron (from Darkstalkers)
 Shin Akuma (Shin Gouki in Japan) (originally from Street Fighter Alpha 2)

Soundtrack
Capcom Fighting Jam: Original Soundtrack, an officially licensed soundtrack of the game, was released on December 12, 2004, in Japan only. This album features the original music found in the game composed by Noriyuki Asakura. The first pressing of this album came with an exclusive mini disc that featured both the vocal and instrumental versions of Ingrid's Theme; 'Heat Haze' by Maiko Kubo. The cover artwork was done by Shinkiro.

Reception

The PlayStation 2 and Xbox versions received "mixed" reviews according to the review aggregation website Metacritic. In Japan, Famitsu gave the former console version a score of 26 out of 40.

The game was criticized because all of the characters, except Ingrid, were copy-and-pasted from their respective games, where the Street Fighter II characters were taken from Capcom vs. SNK 2, but had drastically cut-down animation frames. Comparisons were instantly drawn to the similar Vs. Marvel and SNK series of games, and the gameplay of this newest fighter seemed to lack the finesse of previous games. Many series favorites such as Ken, Sagat and Morrigan were also relegated to background appearances or cameos in the endings, which did little to aid the game's popularity. The game also received criticism that certain moves that the characters originally had were not available to the player, which led to some backlash from fans of the games. The game enjoyed a brief period of competitive play in Japan, but was soon dropped from most major tournaments.

Producer Yoshinori Ono has admitted that the game was essentially a salvaged version of Capcom Fighting All-Stars, and has also stated how the crossover, mechanics, and inclusion of the various gameplay systems inherent to each series lead to balancing problems. Ono also said that he replaced another producer who had been in charge of the game's creation before leaving during the middle of its production.

Notes

References

External links
 
 

2004 video games
Arcade video games
Capcom games
PlayStation 2 games
PlayStation Network games
Fighting games
Xbox games
Crossover fighting games
Fighting games used at the Super Battle Opera tournament
Video games developed in Japan
Video games scored by Noriyuki Asakura
Video games set in Thailand